Cillaeinae is a subfamily of sap-feeding beetles in the family Nitidulidae. There are about 9 genera and at least 150 described species in Cillaeinae.

Genera
 Apetasimus Sharp in Sharp and Scott, 1908
 Brachypeplus Erichson, 1842
 Cillaeopeplus Sharp in Sharp and Scott, 1908
 Colopterus Erichson, 1842
 Conotelus Erichson, 1843
 Eupetinus Sharp in Sharp and Scott, 1908
 Gonioryctus Sharp, 1878
 Orthostolus Sharp in Sharp and Scott, 1908
 Prosopeus Murray, 1864

References

 Bouchard, P., Y. Bousquet, A. Davies, M. Alonso-Zarazaga, J. Lawrence, C. Lyal, A. Newton, et al. (2011). "Family-group names in Coleoptera (Insecta)". ZooKeys, vol. 88, 1–972.
 Habeck, Dale H. / Arnett, Ross H. Jr., Michael C. Thomas, Paul E. Skelley, and J. H. Frank, eds. (2002). "Family 77. Nitidulidae Latreille 1802". American Beetles, vol. 2: Polyphaga: Scarabaeoidea through Curculionoidea, 311–315.
 Lawrence, J. F., and A. F. Newton Jr. / Pakaluk, James, and Stanislaw Adam Slipinski, eds. (1995). "Families and subfamilies of Coleoptera (with selected genera, notes, references and data on family-group names)". Biology, Phylogeny, and Classification of Coleoptera: Papers Celebrating the 80th Birthday of Roy A. Crowson, vol. 2, 779–1006.

Further reading

 Arnett, R. H. Jr., M. C. Thomas, P. E. Skelley and J. H. Frank. (eds.). (21 June 2002). American Beetles, Volume II: Polyphaga: Scarabaeoidea through Curculionoidea. CRC Press LLC, Boca Raton, Florida .
 Arnett, Ross H. (2000). American Insects: A Handbook of the Insects of America North of Mexico. CRC Press.
 Richard E. White. (1983). Peterson Field Guides: Beetles. Houghton Mifflin Company.

Nitidulidae
Beetle subfamilies